George Andrew may refer to:
 George Andrew (Australian footballer) (1917–1987), Australian rules footballer
 George Andrew (Scottish footballer) (1945–1993), centre-back

See also
 George Andrews (disambiguation)